ST Brolga was an auxiliary minesweeper operated by the Royal Australian Navy (RAN). Brolga was operated commercially as a fishing boat until she was acquired in April 1917 for minesweeping duties during World War I. Brolga was returned to her owners in February 1918.

Fate
Albert San was wrecked on 13 August 1926 and declared a total loss.

References
http://www.teesbuiltships.co.uk/smiths/19101915/brolga1915.htm

1914 ships
Ships built on the River Tees
Minesweepers of the Royal Australian Navy
Maritime incidents in 1926
Fishing ships of Australia